is a 1996 Japanese Pink film directed by Toshiki Satō. It was chosen as Best Film of the year at the Pink Grand Prix ceremony.

Synopsis
A bored housewife dreams of becoming a novelist. She enrolls in a writing class and commences an affair with her tutor.

Cast
 Hotaru Hazuki
 Yukiko Izumi
 Takeshi Itō
 Kazuhiro Sano

Critical reception
Besides winning Best Film spot at the Pink Grand Prix, lead actress Hotaru Hazuki was awarded Best Actress and Masahiro Kobayashi won Best Screenplay at the awards ceremony. As an indication of the growing female audience for the pink film genre in recent years, the film was featured as a "Ladies Theatre" selection on the AII broadband service. The site described Adultery Diary as a pink Ghost.

Bibliography

English

Japanese

References

1996 films
1990s erotic films
Films directed by Toshiki Satō
1990s Japanese-language films
Pink films
Shintōhō Eiga films
1990s pornographic films
1990s Japanese films